Robert Agengo (born April 22, 1986) is a Kenyan actor and casting director. He is most known for his roles in The Boy Who Harnessed the Wind (2019), Sue Na Jonnie, Mali, Kona, and 40 Sticks (2020).

Early life
Robert Agengo was born in Kibera, Nairobi on April 22, 1986. He went to Ayany Primary School between 1993 and 2000. While there, he developed an interest in acting, first appearing on TV in the 90s, performing in a play, Mistake, which was broadcast on Kenya's national broadcaster, Kenya Broadcasting Corporation.

He completed his secondary education at Ngelani High School in 2004, following years of active involvement in the school's Drama Club. Robert also terms himself as an amateur boxer, having developed an interest in it while working out at a neighbour's local gym.

Career
Following graduation from high school, Robert took part in an array of auditions which eventually landed him a spot at Jicho Four Productions. During his time here, he would travel to different schools all over the country performing set book performances. He left the production house in 2005 to pursue a career on the mainstage, at the Kenya National Theatre.

The next 2 years spanned performances in plays across Kenya's capital, including the Kenya National Theatre, Alliance_française in Nairobi, and the former Phoenix Players. He then forayed into film, pursuing auditions which mostly landed him roles as an extra in numerous local television shows, such as Makutano Junction, Shika Pata Potea, Krazy Kenyans and Changes.

Agengo featured in the 2010 film Lost in Africa (originally titled Kidnappet), which starred actress Connie Nielsen in a lead role. Thereafter, he landed a role in the recurring scripted series, Mali (TV Series), which preceded another pivotal moment in his career when he landed a significant role on the Multichoice Africa television show Kona_(TV_Series) in 2013.

The Kenyan actor has gone on to star in a host of other local and continental television shows such as Warembo Salon, Skandals Kibao and Sue na Jonnie, recognised as one of the most popular shows in Africa. In 2014, he featured in a total of four films for Multichoice Africa, before landing a role in Chiwetel Ejiofor's critically acclaimed Netflix film The Boy Who Harnessed the Wind. In 2020, he starred on the thriller 40 Sticks which was made available worldwide to stream on Netflix.

Work

Filmography
He has appeared in the following films:
2020 40 Sticks, as Pablo
2019 The Boy Who Harnessed the Wind, as Jeremiah Kamkwamba

Television
In East Africa, he is most famous for his leading roles in series such as Kona (TV series) and in Sue na Jonnie.

Awards and recognition
2020 Kisima Music Film Awards for Best Actor, for 40 Sticks
2020 Africa Movie Academy Award for Best Actor in a Leading Role, nomination for his role in 40 Sticks

References

Living people
1986 births
Kenyan male film actors
People from Nairobi
Kenyan male television actors
21st-century Kenyan male actors